Ole Svendsen (born 27 April 1952 in Aalborg, Nordjylland) is a retired male welterweight boxer from Denmark.

Biography
He represented his native country at the 1980 Summer Olympics in Moscow.

Svendsen was eliminated in the first round by Seychelles' Michael Pillay on points (1-4) in the men's welterweight division (– 67 kg). He was one of three boxers representing Denmark at the 1980 Summer Olympics, the others being Jesper Garnell (lightweight) and Michael Madsen (light heavyweight).

1980 Olympic results
Below is the record of Ole Svendsen, a Danish Welterweight boxer who competed at the 1980 Moscow Olympics:

 Round of 32: lost to Michael Pillay (Seychelles) by decision, 1-4

References

1952 births
Living people
Welterweight boxers
Boxers at the 1980 Summer Olympics
Olympic boxers of Denmark
Sportspeople from Aalborg
Danish male boxers